The 2020 UConn Huskies baseball team represents the University of Connecticut in the 2020 NCAA Division I baseball season.  The Huskies play their home games at Elliot Ballpark, their brand new stadium on campus in Storrs, Connecticut.  The team is coached by Jim Penders, in his 17th season at UConn.

On March 12, 2020, the season was canceled due to the coronavirus pandemic.

Previous season
The Huskies posted an overall record of 39–25 in 2019, finishing 4th in the American with a 12–12 record.  They reached the 2019 American Athletic Conference baseball tournament final, where they fell to Cincinnati.  In the NCAA Oklahoma City Regional, the Huskies also advanced to the final, forcing a decisive game, before falling to host Oklahoma State.

Personnel

Roster

Coaches

Schedule

References

UConn
UConn Huskies baseball seasons
UConn Huskies baseball